= 2026 Champaign County, Illinois Executive election =

2026 Champaign County, Illinois Executive Democratic primary
- March 17, 2026

Nominee	Michelle Jett	Sanford Hess
Party	Democratic	Democratic
Popular vote	10,903	7,252
Percentage	60.06%	39.94%
- Township results Jett: 50–60% 60–70% 70–80% 80–90% Hess: 50–60%
County Executive before election
Steve Summers
Democratic
Elected County Executive
Michelle Jett
Democratic

The 2026 Champaign County, Illinois Executive election was held on November 3, 2026. Incumbent Democratic County Executive Steve Summers declined to seek re-election to a second term. On March 17, 2026, Michelle Jett, the Champaign County director of administration under Summers, won the Democratic nomination against Champaign Township Board Trustee Sanford Hess. She ran unopposed in the general election.

== Democratic primary ==
=== Candidates ===
- Michelle Jett, Champaign County director of administration
- Sanford Hess, Champaign Township Board Trustee

=== Primary results ===
Democratic primary results
Party	Candidate	Votes	%
Democratic	Michelle Jett	10,903	60.06%
Democratic	Sanford Hess	7,252	39.94%
Total votes		18,155	100.00%

== Republican nomination ==
No candidates filed for the Republican nomination and no candidate was named to fill the vacancy on the ballot.

== General election ==
=== Results ===
2026 Champaign County Executive election
Party	Candidate	Votes	%
Democratic	Michelle Jett	52,653	100%
Total votes		52,653	100%
Democratic hold			
